This is a (partial) list of things named for Friedrich Wilhelm Bessel, a 19th-century German scholar who worked in astronomy, geodesy and mathematical sciences:

Astronomy, geodesy, astronomical bodies

 1552 Bessel
 Bessel's star; see 61 Cygni
 Bessel (crater)
 Bessel ellipsoid
Besselian elements
Besselian epoch
Bessel points
Repsoid–Bessel pendulum

Mathematics
 Bessel's correction
 Bessel's differential equation
 Bessel's inequality
 Bessel potential
 Bessel potential spaces
 Bessel process

Bessel and related functions
 Bessel beam
 Bessel filter
 Bessel function
Bessel–Maitland function
Incomplete Bessel functions
 Bessel polynomial
q-Bessel polynomials
Bessel series, see Fourier–Bessel series
 Bessel window
Bessel–Clifford function
Fourier–Bessel series

Bessel
B